The Art Ross Trophy is awarded to the National Hockey League (NHL) player who leads the league in points at the end of the regular season. It was presented to the league by former player, General Manager, and head coach Art Ross. The trophy has been awarded 70 times to 29 players since its introduction in the 1947–48 NHL season. Ross is also known for his design of the official NHL puck, with slightly bevelled edges for better control.

The current holder, for the second consecutive season, is Connor McDavid of the Edmonton Oilers.

History

The Art Ross Trophy was presented to the National Hockey League (NHL) in 1947 by Arthur Howey "Art" Ross, former General Manager and head coach of the Boston Bruins and Hockey Hall of Fame inductee as a player. Elmer Lach of the Montreal Canadiens was the winner of the first Art Ross Trophy, which was awarded at the conclusion of the  season.

Players from the Pittsburgh Penguins won the trophy 15 times and Edmonton Oilers have won the trophy 12; while the Montreal Canadiens and Chicago Blackhawks are tied for third, as players from each of those teams have won the trophy a total of nine times.  Although Joe Thornton, winner from the  season, started the season playing for the Boston Bruins, he finished with the San Jose Sharks and the award counts for the Sharks. Therefore, Boston Bruins have seven players winning the trophy, fifth overall.

From 1951 to 2001, Jean Beliveau, Marcel Dionne, and Bryan Trottier were the only single-time winners of the scoring title, while Gordie Howe, Bernie Geoffrion, Dickie Moore, Bobby Hull, Stan Mikita, Phil Esposito, Bobby Orr, Guy Lafleur, Wayne Gretzky, Mario Lemieux, and Jaromir Jagr all won it on multiple occasions. For two decades, from 1981 to 2001, only three players won the Art Ross Trophy: Gretzky, Lemieux, and Jagr. The streak ended when Jarome Iginla won the trophy in 2002.

Gretzky has won the trophy a record ten times, including seven consecutive, during his 20-year NHL career. Gordie Howe and Lemieux have each won it six times, while Esposito and Jagr each have five. Jagr, from the Czech Republic, has won the award the most times by a non-Canadian. Patrick Kane is the only American born player to win the trophy, doing so in 2016. Gretzky is the only player to win the trophy for more than one team, while Thornton is the only player to win it while playing for two different teams in one season. Orr is the only defenseman to win the scoring title, doing so in 1970 and 1975 with Boston, and in 1970 he became the first player to capture four individual awards in a single season as he won the Hart, Norris, and Conn Smythe Trophies that year as well.

In 2007, Sidney Crosby became the youngest player to win the Art Ross Trophy at age 19, and also became the youngest scoring champion in any major North American professional sport. At almost twice Crosby's age, Martin St. Louis became the oldest player to capture the Art Ross at the age of 37, also having the longest gap between scoring titles (nine years). Henrik and Daniel Sedin are the only siblings to win the award, in 2010 and 2011, respectively. Since 2001, only four players, Connor McDavid, Crosby, Evgeni Malkin, and St. Louis have won the award more than once: Crosby in 2007 and 2014, Malkin in 2009 and 2012, St. Louis in 2004 and 2013, and McDavid in 2017, 2018, 2021 and 2022. McDavid and Gretzky are the only players to win multiple Art Ross trophies before age 21.

The NHL rules stipulate three tiebreakers in case two or more players are tied in points:
Player with most goals
Player with fewer games played
Player scoring first goal of the season

In those respective seasons, Hull won over Andy Bathgate, Dionne over Gretzky, and Jagr over Eric Lindros. The NHL's award to recognize the leading goal-scorer, the Maurice "Rocket" Richard Trophy, does not have a tiebreaker, allowing multiple winners to be recognized in any one season.

Winners

Bold Player with the most points ever scored in a season.

See also
List of National Hockey League awards
List of NHL players
List of NHL statistical leaders

References

Specific

General
Art Ross Trophy at NHL.com
Art Ross Trophy history at Legends of Hockey.net

National Hockey League trophies and awards
Awards established in 1948